Bustill is a surname. Notable people with the surname include:

 The Bustill family, whose notable members were:
 Cyrus Bustill (1732–1806) African American abolitionist, baker and founding member of the Free African Society
 Charles Hicks Bustill (1816–1890), American, plasterer, abolitionist and conductor in the Underground Railroad
 Joseph Cassey Bustill (1822–1895), African American conductor in the Underground Railroad
 Maria Louisa Bustill (1853–1904), American, Quaker schoolteacher